Acharia is a genus of moths in the family Limacodidae.

Species
The following species are classified in the genus.  This species list may be incomplete.
 Acharia affinis   (Möschler, 1883) 
Acharia apicalis (Dyar, 1900)
Acharia brunnus (Cramer, 1777)
Acharia extensa (Schaus, 1896)
 Acharia hyperoche   (Dognin, 1914) 
Acharia horrida  (Dyar, 1905)
 Acharia nesea  (Stoll, 1780)  
 Acharia ophelians   (Dyar, 1927) 
 Acharia saras    Dyar  
Acharia stimulea (syn. Sibine stimulea) – saddleback caterpillar moth (Clemens, 1860)

References 

Limacodidae genera
Limacodidae